Panga is a village in Ridala Parish, Lääne County, in western Estonia.

There is basic school (Ridala põhikool).

References

Villages in Lääne County